Oskar Hirsch (November 14, 1877 - April 20, 1965) was a Viennese otolaryngologist. In 1910, he described his classic transsphenoidal surgery technique for pituitary gland surgery.

References

Austrian otolaryngologists
1877 births
1965 deaths
Austro-Hungarian physicians